Khamak in Iran may refer to:
 Khamak, Hirmand
 Khamak, Zehak
 Khamak Rural District, in Zehak County